Tracey Danielle McFarlane (born July 20, 1966), later known by her married name Tracey Mirande, is a former competition  swimmer who represented both Canada and the United States in international championships.  She competed primarily in breaststroke events.

McFarlane represented the United States at the 1988 Summer Olympics in Seoul, South Korea.  She won a silver medal as a member of the second-place U.S. team in the women's 4×100-meter medley relay; her silver-medal teammates included Beth Barr (backstroke), Janel Jorgensen (butterfly), and Mary Wayte (freestyle).

She held the American record in the 100-meter breaststroke from 1988 to 1992, with a time of 1:09.60.

She attended the University of Texas, and swam for the Texas Longhorns swimming and diving team in National Collegiate Athletic Association (NCAA) competition.  She was inducted into the university's Athletics Hall of Fame in 2006.

See also
 List of Olympic medalists in swimming (women)
 List of University of Texas at Austin alumni
 List of World Aquatics Championships medalists in swimming (women)

References

External links
 

1966 births
Living people
American female breaststroke swimmers
Canadian expatriate sportspeople in the United States
Canadian female breaststroke swimmers
Olympic silver medalists for the United States in swimming
Swimmers from Montreal
Swimmers at the 1988 Summer Olympics
Texas Longhorns women's swimmers
World Aquatics Championships medalists in swimming
Medalists at the 1988 Summer Olympics